Timotej Záhumenský (born 17 July 1995) is a Slovak footballer who plays as a left back for Dukla Banská Bystrica.

Club career

Slovan Bratislava
Záhumenský made his Corgoň liga debut for Slovan Bratislava in a traditional derby at Štadión Antona Malatinského on 31 May 2014 against Spartak Trnava, being sent off in the 52nd minute of the match after receiving a second yellow card.

FK Pohronie
After half-year spent in Czech First League with Zbrojovka Brno, Záhumenský returned to Fortuna Liga to feature for Pohronie.

Personal life
Záhumenský was born in Žiar nad Hronom and grew up in Nová Baňa. According to his social media communication, Záhumenský adheres to Catholicism.

References

External links
 
 Futbalnet profile

1995 births
Living people
Sportspeople from Žiar nad Hronom
Slovak footballers
Slovak expatriate footballers
Slovak Roman Catholics
Association football defenders
ŠK Slovan Bratislava players
FK Železiarne Podbrezová players
MFK Skalica players
FC ŠTK 1914 Šamorín players
FC ViOn Zlaté Moravce players
FC DAC 1904 Dunajská Streda players
MFK Karviná players
FC Spartak Trnava players
FC Nitra players
FC Zbrojovka Brno players
FK Pohronie players
MFK Dukla Banská Bystrica players
Slovak Super Liga players
2. Liga (Slovakia) players
Czech First League players
Expatriate footballers in the Czech Republic
Slovak expatriate sportspeople in the Czech Republic